Decrick De'Shawn "Dede" Westbrook (born November 21, 1993) is an American football wide receiver and return specialist who is a free agent. He played college football at Oklahoma. He was drafted 110th overall in the 2017 NFL Draft by the Jacksonville Jaguars where he played until 2020. He also played for the Minnesota Vikings in 2021.

Early years
Westbrook attended C. H. Yoe High School in Cameron, Texas, where he played high school football for the Yoemen. As a three-year letterer and starter, Westbrook caught a career total of 116 passes for 1,670 yards and 25 touchdowns. He also started at defensive back, racking 77 career tackles, 2 sacks, and 3 interceptions throughout his career. Although he was originally a highly touted recruit, Dede received a season-ending injury early into his senior year when a bad tackle ruptured his lower intestine. He spent over a month recovering in a hospital bed and several more months recovering through therapy, which took a toll on his physical and mental health; many recruiters withdrew their interest when his weight and grades both started to plummet. Many believed Dede's football career was permanently over.

Dede was regarded as a three-star recruit and was ranked the No. 97 wide receiver prospect in the Class of 2012 by ESPN. After getting scholarship offers from Oklahoma State, Texas Tech, UTEP, Utah State, and Wyoming, Dede committed to Texas State University to play for the Texas State Bobcats. However, Dede's grades were still not good enough to allow him to be admitted into the school, so he ultimately went the junior college route and played at Blinn College.

While in high school, Dede excelled in basketball and track.

College career
After fully recovering from his injury, Westbrook had a breakout season at Blinn College where he caught passes for 1,471 yards and 13 touchdowns. Dede was named one of the top junior college recruits and received over 30 scholarship offers, including from some who rescinded their offers when he was injured in high school. He ultimately transferred to the University of Oklahoma to play under head coach Bob Stoops. In his first year at Oklahoma in 2015, he started all 13 games and had 46 receptions for 743 yards and four touchdowns. Westbrook became Oklahoma's number one wide receiver during his senior year in 2016. Against Texas, he set a school record with 232 receiving yards, breaking the previous record of 217 held by Ryan Broyles. He led the Big 12 Conference with 1,524 receiving yards and 17 receiving touchdowns in 2016.

On December 5, 2016, Westbrook was announced as one of the finalists for the 2016 Heisman Trophy, along with quarterbacks Deshaun Watson, Lamar Jackson, Baker Mayfield, and defensive back Jabrill Peppers, from Clemson, Louisville, Oklahoma, and Michigan, respectively. He ended up finishing in fourth place in the Heisman Trophy voting behind Mayfield (3rd), Watson (2nd), and Jackson (1st).

College statistics

Professional career
Westbrook declined an invitation to play in the Senior Bowl. He received an invitation to the NFL Scouting Combine, but decided to not perform any drills. At Oklahoma's Pro Day, he elected to run all the required combine drills. After finally performing for scouts and team representatives, Westbrook draft projections varied from the second round to the fourth round from draft experts and analysts. He was ranked the third best wide receiver by Pro Football Focus, the 14th best by Sports Illustrated, and was ranked the 15th best by NFLDraftScout.com.

Jacksonville Jaguars
The Jacksonville Jaguars selected Westbrook in the fourth round (110th overall) of the 2017 NFL Draft. He was the 15th wide receiver selected in 2017.

2017 season
On May 16, 2017, the Jacksonville Jaguars signed Westbrook to a four-year, $3.07 million contract with a signing bonus of $676,156. He was placed on injured reserve with a designation to return on September 8, 2017, after dealing with a core muscle injury. On November 18, he was activated off injured reserve. Overall, in his rookie season, he totaled 27 receptions for 339 yards and one touchdown.

The Jaguars made the 2017 NFL playoffs as the #3-seed in the AFC. In the Wild Card Round, they defeated the Buffalo Bills, 10–3. In his first career postseason game, Westbrook caught five passes for 48 yards on eight targets, which included a 20-yard reception in the beginning of the third quarter. He was the game's leading receiver. In the Divisional Round against the Pittsburgh Steelers, he had an eight-yard reception in the 45–42 victory. In the AFC Championship loss to the New England Patriots, he had a 24-yard reception.

2018 season
In Week 2 against the New England Patriots, Westbrook recorded a 61-yard touchdown reception in the 31–20 victory. In Week 4, in a victory over the New York Jets, he had a career-high nine receptions for 130 receiving yards in the 31–12 victory. In Week 15, against the Washington Redskins, he recorded a 74-yard punt return touchdown in the 16–13 loss. Overall, he finished the 2018 season with 66 receptions for 717 receiving yards and five receiving touchdowns. He led the Jaguars in receptions, yards, and touchdowns in 2018.

2019 season
In Week 7, a 27–17 victory over the Cincinnati Bengals, he had six receptions for 103 receiving yards. Overall, he finished the season with 66 receptions for 660 receiving yards and three receiving touchdowns.

2020 season
Westbrook entered 2020 fourth on the Jaguars wide receiver depth chart. In Week 7, he suffered a torn ACL and was placed on injured reserve on October 26.

Minnesota Vikings
On July 26, 2021, Westbrook signed with the Minnesota Vikings on a one-year contract. In the 2021 season, Westbrook appeared in 15 games and recorded ten receptions for 68 receiving yards to go along with some punt return duties.

On October 25, 2022, the Miami Dolphins hosted Westbrook for a workout. Four days later, the Cincinnati Bengals also hosted Westbrook for a workout.

Green Bay Packers
On November 15, 2022, Westbrook signed to the Green Bay Packers' practice squad. He was released on December 13, 2022.

NFL career statistics

References

External links
Oklahoma Sooners bio

1993 births
Living people
Players of American football from Texas
American football wide receivers
Blinn Buccaneers football players
Oklahoma Sooners football players
Jacksonville Jaguars players
All-American college football players
People from Cameron, Texas
Minnesota Vikings players
Green Bay Packers players